Robert Smith is a male British former sports shooter.

Sports shooting career
Smith represented England and won a bronze medal in the 10 metres air rifle pairs with Malcolm Cooper, at the 1986 Commonwealth Games in Edinburgh, Scotland. Four years later he represented England again and won two more medals; both silver, in the 10 metres air rifle pairs with Chris Hector and in the 50 metres small bore rifle three positions pairs, with Malcolm Cooper, at the 1990 Commonwealth Games in Auckland, New Zealand

References

Living people
British male sport shooters
Shooters at the 1986 Commonwealth Games
Shooters at the 1990 Commonwealth Games
Commonwealth Games medallists in shooting
Commonwealth Games gold medallists for England
Commonwealth Games silver medallists for England
Year of birth missing (living people)
Medallists at the 1986 Commonwealth Games
Medallists at the 1990 Commonwealth Games